Possibility Space is a video game development studio founded in 2021 by Jeff Strain and a diverse and experienced team of game and media industry veterans. With primary offices in New Orleans, LA, the studio embraces a physically distributed model with employees from a number of different regions and time zones.  

In a press release announcing the launch of the studio, Founder and CEO Jeff Strain said, “We felt this was the right time to create something new—a studio built from the ground up to embrace evolving needs and perspectives for both players and developers. […] Possibility Space [is] a modern kind of game studio, where we are creating a joyful game that’s been my dream for many years.”  

Possibility Space attempts to hire and mentor people from underserved and overlooked communities and backgrounds.

In an interview with IGN, Strain said the studio is developing a AAA title.

References 

Video game development companies
2021 establishments in Louisiana